This is a chronological list of mayors of Plovdiv, the second largest city of Bulgaria, since that post was established after the Liberation of Bulgaria in 1878.

References
 History of the mayors. Plovdiv municipal website, accessed 4 April 2006.

See also
 Timeline of Plovdiv
 List of mayors of Sofia
 List of mayors of Varna
 List of mayors of Pleven

Plovdiv
History of Plovdiv